Cikupa is a town and district within Tangerang Regency in the province of Banten, Java, Indonesia. The population at the 2010 Census was 224,678.

Tangerang Regency
Districts of Banten
Populated places in Banten